List of prisons in the United Kingdom is a list of all 141 current prisons as of 2022 in the United Kingdom spread across the three UK legal systems of England and Wales (122 prisons), Scotland, (15 prisons) and Northern Ireland (4 prisons). Also included are a number of historical prisons no longer in current use.

Prisons, Prison Services, Prison Population and Prisoner Categories

England, Wales, Scotland and Northern Ireland
Public Sector prisons in England and Wales are managed by His Majesty's Prison Service (HMPS), which is part of the His Majesty's Prison and Probation Service, an executive agency of the United Kingdom government. In addition, since the 1990s the day-to-day running of a number of previously existing prisons, as well as several new facilities, has been "contracted out" to private companies, such as Serco and G4S. All prisons in England and Wales, whether publicly or privately run, are inspected by His Majesty's Inspectorate of Prisons. Prisons in Scotland are run by the Scottish Prison Service and prisons in Northern Ireland are run by the Northern Ireland Prison Service.

There are also "Immigration Removal Centres" run by the Home Office.

The following tables below list all current and some historical prisons and Young Offender Institutions in use in the three UK legal systems of England and Wales, Scotland and Northern Ireland as of 2022. The majority house adult males, and are operated by each legal systems respective public prison service, although a small number are operated by private prison companies. There are also a small number of adult female prisons and youth prisons/secure children's units for those under 18.

Population
As of 2021, the total prison population of the UK (England & Wales, Scotland and Northern Ireland combined) stands at roughly 87,000, one of the largest in the Western world. With the increasing population, law changes resulting in longer prison sentences and a national government prison building program to build 20,000 more prison spaces by the mid 2020s the total UK prison population is expected to increase to almost 110,000 by 2026.

United Kingdom Prisoner Categories and Establishment Types

In the UK adult prisoners are divided into 4 security categories (though male and female categories are slightly different) depending on certain factors such as the offences they have been convicted or accused of, their likelihood of attempting an escape, the threat they would pose if they escaped, their length of sentence, and any of their previous criminal convictions, if any. Male categories are as follows,

Category A – 'Those whose escape would be highly dangerous to the public or national security'. Typically for example those convicted of offences such as murder, manslaughter, terrorism, rape, wounding with intent (GBH), robbery, serious firearm and explosives offences, offences against the state, those sentenced under the Official Secrets Act, or any attempts of those offences. There are a total of ten Category A prisons in the UK, eight are located in England and Wales, one in Scotland and one in Northern Ireland. HM Prison Belmarsh is an example of a Category A prison. They are the equivalent of a supermax/maximum security prison in the United States for example.
 
Category B – 'Those who do not require maximum security, but for whom escape still needs to be made very difficult'. Typically for those convicted of the same types offences as category A prisoners, but who are not judged to be as high risk or those who have served a long time as a category A prisoner with good behaviour/rehabilitation are sometimes downgraded to category B. HM Prison Wormwood Scrubs is an example of a Category B prison. They are the equivalent of a medium security prison in the United States for example.
 
Category C – 'Those who cannot be trusted in open conditions but who are unlikely to try to escape'. Typically for those convicted of minor offences and who are serving shorter sentences no more than a few years in length. Also category B prisoners coming to the end of their sentence are sometimes downgraded to category C to prepare them for release. HM Prison Berwyn is an example of a Category C prison. They are the equivalent of a minimum security prison in the United States for example.

 Category D – 'Those who can be reasonably trusted not to try to escape, and are given the privilege of an open prison'. Category D prisoners are held in "Open Prisons" in which they are trusted to be able to move freely around the prison without risk and who after completing a risk assessment may be allowed to work outside of the prison in the community or allowed short home visits for a set number of hours a week. Also category C prisoners coming to the end of their sentence are sometimes downgraded to category D to prepare them for release. HM Prison Ford is an example of a Category D prison. They are the equivalent of a minimum security work release prison or local jail in the United States for example.

Adult women in England and Wales are categorised with four slightly different types of security levels, from lowest to highest being  Open,   Closed,   Restricted Status  and  Category A '. However Category A for women is rarely used due to the fairly low number of women being held for such serious offences, meaning most are held either in Closed or Restricted Status conditions. Northern Ireland operates a similar system to England and Wales. Scotland operates a separate three category system, from lowest to highest being  Low,   Medium  and  High Supervision  (High Supervision being similar to Category A for adults in England, Wales and Northern Ireland).

Additionally whereas males and females aged 18 or over are held in dedicated adult prisons, those under 18 (and sometimes under 21) are held in one of three types of establishments across the country that are run by either the public prison service, private companies (such as G4S or Serco), local council authorities and in rare cases some charity providers. They are,

 Young Offender Institutions (YOIs)  which are prison based establishments very similar to adult prisons that hold those convicted and remanded for offences but that only hold males aged 15-20 (ages 15-17 and ages 18-20 are housed separately) and who are not classed as vulnerable.

 Secure Training Centres (STCs)  which are secure custody establishments but that focus more on things such as education, welfare, health and support rather than traditional prison style punishment. They hold convicted males aged 12-14 and females aged 12–17 in separate accommodation. Though males aged 15-17 can be held also if they are classed as vulnerable.

 Secure Children's Homes (SCHs)  which are similar to STC's in that they mainly focus on things like education, welfare, health and support rather than traditional prison style punishment. They hold very young males and females aged 10–11 convicted or remanded usually for only serious offences. Though males and females aged 12-14 can be held also if they are classed as vulnerable. Additionally males and females all the way up to the age of 17 can be held if they are refused bail and remanded (but not yet convicted) to be held by local children's authorities (and not the prison service) usually if they are more vulnerable, at risk or a YOI is not suitable. It should also be noted that not all children held in SCHs have necessarily been convicted, remanded or accused of crimes, some are held by court orders on safety grounds  under legislation such as the Children Act 1989 due to things like their history of absconding from regular open children's care homes, risk of committing harm to themselves or others, or those at high risk of vulnerability from things such as forms of abuse, illicit drugs use and child prostitution.

More can be found here: Prisoner security categories in the United Kingdom.

Prisons and Young Offender Institutions 

HMP The Verne is now acting as a public sector category C prison.

Former prisons

Northern Ireland (Northern Ireland Prison Service) 
The following table lists the three active prisons in Northern Ireland. All three are operated by the Northern Ireland Prison Service. There is also a Juvenile Justice Centre, located in Bangor, County Down, which is operated by the Youth Justice Agency. It is also used as a prison officer training centre.

Former prison
 Maze, County Antrim (also called Long Kesh) – closed 29 September 2000

Scotland (Scottish Prison Service)

Former prisons

Future prisons

See also
 United Kingdom prison population
Slopping out

References

External links

 Find a prison – England and Wales
 Scottish Prison Service
 Northern Ireland Prison Service
Individual histories of Britain's prisons on theprison.org.uk

 
United Kingdom
Prisons
Prisons